The Akwesasne Mohawk Casino (AMC) is a Native American gambling enterprise run by the Saint Regis Mohawk Tribe in Akwesasne, New York.  It has  for 1,800+ slot machines and 30 table games. The casino is located within the boundaries of the Akwesasne Mohawk reservation as defined in the 1796 Treaty with the Seven Nations of Canada.

Facilities
The casino is a casino resort with hotel, spas, diner and lounge. This resort provides 150 rooms and luxury suites. Spas are located on the second floor. Cascade Lounge offers drink and entertainment within the casino. The resort also has shows of live music, comedy and sport events.

The casino has 30 table games which includes Blackjack, Caribbean Stud Poker, Mississippi Stud, Let It Ride!, Pai Gow Poker, Roulette and Craps. It also has bingo in their Mohawk Bingo Palace everyday throughout the week. Bingo starts every Saturday night at 10:30 with theme night costume contest for cash drawings. Within the Mohawk Bingo Palace there is a poker room that offers shark tank bounty hunter every Sunday, unlimited rebuy no-limit Texas hold'em every Monday, Turbo Tuesday and no limit hold'em bounty tournament every Wednesday. There are also more than 1,800 slot machines.

Expansion
The Akwesasne Mohawk Casino was opened on April 12, 1999. It has grown into one of the largest entertainment destinations in the North Country. In 2011 the casino invested $74 million to expand.  On May 9, 2013 the casino has completed an expansion that included a 7-storey hotel with 150 rooms, heated indoor pool, Jacuzzi, fitness center, spas and restaurants.

Employment awards
Every year the committee would review the nominations and select the winner of manager of the year by voting. Each winner received a $1,000 Keybank gift card and a plaque of recognition. All of the nominees received a $150 AMCR gift certificate and a plaque.

See also
List of casinos in New York
Kahnawake Gaming Commission, regulating Mohawk gambling in Canada

References

External links
Official site

Akwesasne
Casinos in New York (state)
Casino hotels
Native American casinos
Mohawk tribe
Buildings and structures in Franklin County, New York
Tourist attractions in Franklin County, New York
Native American history of New York (state)